Marcos Tulio Coll Tesillo (23 August 1935 – 5 June 2017), also known as El Olímpico was a Colombian professional footballer. He played for Junior de Barranquilla and other clubs, and represented Colombia in the 1962 FIFA World Cup. He was famous for scoring the first and only until today Olympic goal in any FIFA World Cup, beating legendary goalkeeper Lev Yashin in a 4–4 draw against the Soviets in 1962.

Early life
Coll was born in Barranquilla in 1935.

Career 
He started his career with Sporting Barranquilla (1952–55). In 1956, he played for Independiente Medellín and played his first match for Colombia in a 1958 FIFA World Cup Qualifier in the same year. He later played for Deportes Tolima in 1960. Shortly thereafter in 1962 Coll joined América de Cali where he was remembered with scoring a notable goal. In 1965 he played for Deportes Tolima. In the period of 1970-1971 Coll played for Atlético Junior after which he retired from his career as a footballer.

1962 Olympic goal

This achievement came in Arica, Chile, on 3 June 1962, during the development of the game between Colombia and the USSR of the first round of the World Cup. Colombia was down 4–1. Then they were given a corner kick. Marco Coll kicked the ball and scored a direct goal. Colombia would eventually tie with USSR with goals from Antonio Rada and Marino Klinger. At one interview, Coll claimed he aimed for the goal as the Colombian players were too short compared to their Russian opponents. Coll also said it was the first and only time he ever tried to score a goal from that position. The goal inspired a reaction to tie the game 4–4.

Death 
Coll died on 5 June 2017, aged 81, in his native Barranquilla after a short illness.

See also 

Olympic goal
1962 FIFA World Cup

References

External links

News/FIFA.com (In Spanish)
Tom Williams: Do You Speak Football?: A Glossary of Football Words and Phrases...
Worlds best Sporting people-Including Marcos Coll (In Spanish)

1935 births
2017 deaths
Footballers from Barranquilla
Colombian footballers
Colombia international footballers
1962 FIFA World Cup players
Categoría Primera A players
Independiente Medellín footballers
Deportes Tolima footballers
Club Atlético River Plate footballers
América de Cali footballers
Atlético Junior footballers
Colombian expatriate footballers
Expatriate footballers in Argentina
Atlético Junior managers
Association football midfielders
Colombian football managers
Colombian people of Scottish descent
Deportes Tolima managers